Cléver Marcelo Romero Silva (born 4 July 1976) is a Uruguayan retired footballer who played as a defensive midfielder, and is a manager.

After emerging at Peñarol he spent seven years of his professional career in Spain, notably at the service of Málaga (six seasons), and played for Uruguay at the 2002 World Cup.

Club career
Born in Montevideo, Romero played in the beginning of his career for local teams Defensor Sporting and Peñarol. In the middle of 2001 he was bought by La Liga club Málaga CF, teaming up with countryman Darío Silva. He was instrumental at the Andalusia side during his first four years, helping them to the quarter-finals of the 2002–03 UEFA Cup, via the Intertoto Cup.

In his final two seasons, however, Romero was virtually absent from the lineups, with 2006–07 being spent, with no success, in Segunda División. In early 2008 he had a brief spell with neighbours Lucena CF of Segunda División B and, on 4 February 2009, signed with Carolina RailHawks FC of the USL First Division. It quickly became apparent that he had suffered significant knee injuries which were not widely publicised, but subsequently all was revealed; physical problems limited him to one substitute appearance in a pre-season exhibition game, and he was released in April without having featured in the league.

Romero started working as a manager also in Spain, with amateurs Alhaurín de la Torre CF. He returned to Málaga in 2014, joining newly appointed Javi Gracia's coaching staff.

On 28 December 2016, following Juande Ramos' dismissal, Romero was appointed first-team manager indefinitely. The following 7 March, he was relieved of his duties.

International career
Romero made his debut for the Uruguay national team on 20 September 1995, in a 1–3 away friendly defeat against Israel. After taking part in two Copa América editions, he played two games for his country at the 2002 FIFA World Cup (the group stage draws to France and Senegal).

In total, Romero earned 24 caps in a nine-year span.

Managerial statistics

Honours

Club
Málaga
UEFA Intertoto Cup: 2002

International
Uruguay
Copa América: Runner-up 1999

References

External links

National team data 

1976 births
Living people
Uruguayan people of Spanish descent
Footballers from Montevideo
Uruguayan footballers
Association football midfielders
Uruguayan Primera División players
Defensor Sporting players
Peñarol players
La Liga players
Segunda División players
Segunda División B players
Málaga CF players
Lucena CF players
North Carolina FC players
Uruguay international footballers
2002 FIFA World Cup players
1997 Copa América players
1999 Copa América players
Uruguayan expatriate footballers
Expatriate footballers in Spain
Expatriate soccer players in the United States
Uruguayan expatriate sportspeople in Spain
Uruguayan expatriate sportspeople in the United States
Uruguayan football managers
La Liga managers
Málaga CF managers
Uruguayan expatriate football managers
Expatriate football managers in Spain